This is a list of islands (besides the main island) of the Atlantic Canadian province of Prince Edward Island:

 Boughton Island, third largest overall, uninhabited but popular for day visits for hiking and picknicking 
 Bunbury Island
 Cascumpeque Sand Hills
 Conway Sand Hills
 George Island
 Glenfinnan Island
 Governors Island, privately owned
 Grover (Ram) Island
 Holman Island
 Malpeque Bay Islands
 Mary Fraser Island
 Courtin Island
 Little Courtin Island
 Little Rock
 Ram Island
 Bird Island
 Lennox Island, home of the Lennox Island First Nation of the Mi'kmaq people, at risk of loss of 50% of land area due to erosion by 2065
 Hog Island, a barrier island forming the northern boundary of Malpeque Bay
 Fish Island, a section of Hog Island that occasionally separates/joins due to erosion and accretion
 Murray Islands, a group of islands within Murray Harbour
 Cherry Island
 Gordons Island
 Herring Island
 Reynolds Island
 Thomas Island
 Oultons Island
 Panmure Island, red sandstone with sandy beaches, home of a community of the same name and Panmure Island Provincial Park
 Robinson's Island
 St. Peter's Island

Prince Edward Island
Islands